Gettysburg Township is a township in Graham County, Kansas, USA.  As of the 2000 census, its population was 83.

Geography
According to the USGS, it contains two cemeteries: Anderson and Rock Creek.

The streams of Antelope Creek, Keys Creek, Rock Creek and Youngs Creek run through this township.

References
 USGS Geographic Names Information System (GNIS)

External links
 US-Counties.com
 City-Data.com

Townships in Graham County, Kansas
Townships in Kansas